Emotional granularity is an individual's ability to differentiate between the specificity of their emotions. Similar to how an interior decorator is aware of fine gradations in shades of blue, where others might see a single color, an individual with high emotional granularity would be able to discriminate between their emotions that all fall within the same level of valence and arousal, labeling their experiences with discrete emotion words. Someone with low emotional granularity would report their emotions in global terms, usually of pleasure or displeasure. It is unknown whether these differences of granularity among individuals stem from an inability of some to verbally label the discrete emotions they feel inside, or whether some people are simply unaware of the distinctions between specific emotions.

History
Emotional granularity is a very specific and complex concept, but can be seen in similar concepts such as emotional differentiation and emotional intelligence. Emotional granularity itself is a fairly new term, developed by Lisa Feldman Barrett. By using the valence/arousal circumplex as a guide, Barrett conducts studies showing that individuals exhibit a certain level of valence focus and arousal focus, which contribute to their overall emotional granularity. It has been found that an individual has a certain valence focus, meaning the extent to which they can differentiate between positive and negative emotions, and an arousal focus, which is the extent to which one can discriminate between high and low arousal emotions.

Valence and arousal

Emotions can be mapped out on a chart modeling the range of arousal (high to low) and valence (pleasure to displeasure) that is experienced during a particular emotion. For example, in the top right corner are the emotions with high arousal and high valence, which include excited, astonished, delighted, happy, and pleased. These emotions are all examples of positive emotions that are high in arousal. In the opposite corner is the low valence and low arousal section, containing miserable, depressed, bored, and tired as some examples.

Using the latter as an example, one with high emotional granularity would be able to differentiate between feeling depressed, bored, tired, and miserable. An individual exhibiting low emotional granularity would clump together all low arousal and negative emotions.  Perhaps in an experiment testing one's emotional granularity, as explained in the following section, a participant would be given hypothetical scenarios to see their ability to distinguish between emotions. For example, researchers would present a traumatic situation to see whether it induces anger, fear, frustration, or more than one of these emotions, indicating whether that the participant is able to produce discrete emotion labels, or instead clumps together these high arousal/negative emotions.

One influence on emotional granularity is language, because one's ability to access emotional language in their memory impacts their labels when making emotional judgments. The speed and accuracy that one exhibits when verbalizing discrete emotion labels for oneself or another depends on the available emotion words.

Experiments
To further research this concept, studies are being conducted to unveil what components contribute to one’s level of emotional granularity. Some of the aspects being looked at are an individual’s emotional intelligence, the method of self-reporting, and making emotional judgments about others.

Experience sampling

One way to eliminate the invalidity of conducting research in a lab and therefore creating a false atmosphere is experience sampling. This is a research method in which participants report on their emotions in the instance they are occurring. By giving participants a method of recording their feelings as they occur throughout the day, such as a Palm Pilot or journal, it is possible to gather more accurate data.

Lab studies
Other research methods being used are those that take place in lab settings, and provide just as much of a contribution to the research. One benefit of laboratory studies is that variations of valence and arousal can be controlled. In addition, it is important to determine a participant's emotional intelligence, or how much they know about certain emotions. By conducting computer-based tasks asking participants to judge their own or other’s emotions based on written scenarios or images, people’s emotional intelligence can be measured and compared to emotional granularity levels.

Implications
From the limited amount of research that has been conducted on this topic, some implications have already been suggested. It appears that individuals show a wide range of emotional granularity, demonstrated in their self-reports and lab based studies. It has been suggested that high emotional granularity is beneficial for coping with emotional experiences because it allows one to label their emotions more accurately and deal accordingly. Consistent with these findings, other studies have been conducted to test participants' judgment of facial emotions in comparison with their level of resilience, or ability to cope with stress. It was found that when shown neutral faces, participants with higher resilience categorized the face as a positive emotion, and those with low resilience chose a negative emotion category. In addition, this experiment found that participants had faster reaction times when distinguishing between emotions of opposite valence like happiness and sadness, in comparison with emotions of similar valence like sadness and fear. The concept of emotional granularity is still fairly nascent and requires further development, research, and awareness.

References

Emotion